Claude Tousignant  (born December 23, 1932 in Montreal, Quebec) is a Canadian artist. Tousignant is considered to be an important contributor to the development of geometric abstraction in Canada.

Biography 
Claude Tousignant was born in Montreal, Quebec. From 1948 to 1951, he attended the School of Art and Design at the Montreal Museum of Fine Arts where he studied under Arthur Lismer, Louis Archambault, Marian Dale Scott, Jacques de Tonnancour and  Gordon Webber.  He then travelled to Paris where he studied at the Académie Ranson. returning to Montreal in the spring of 1952.

Artistic career

Tousignant is considered a member of the second generation of the modern art movement in Montreal called "les Plasticiens". This group of four painters (Jean-Paul Jérôme, Louis Belzile, Rodolphe de Repentigny and Fernand Toupin) felt painting should be pure form and colour; meaning and spontaneous expression were to be avoided. In 1962, Tousignant introduced the form of the circle, which would become his signature motif,  into his geometric paintings.

Awards 
 Governor General's Award in Visual and Media Arts (2010)
 Paul-Émile Borduas Prize (1989)
 Officer of the Order of Canada (1976)
 Victor Martyn Lynch-Staunton Award (1974)
 Prize from the Canadian Institute of Rome (1973)
 First prize (painting), Perspective' 67, Toronto (1967)
 First prize (painting), Salon de la Jeune Peinture, Paris (1962)
 Member, Royal Canadian Academy of Arts

Museum collections 
 Aldrich Contemporary Art Museum, Ridgefield, Connecticut (USA)
 Artothèque de Montréal
 Art Gallery of Ontario, Toronto
 Canada Council Art Bank, Ottawa
 Musée d'art contemporain de Montréal
 Musée national des beaux-arts du Québec, Quebec City
 Montreal Museum of Fine Arts
 National Gallery of Canada, Ottawa
 Phoenix Art Museum, Arizona (USA)
 Vancouver Art Gallery, British Columbia
 York University, Toronto

References

External links
 perspectives sur Claude Tousignant A retrospective of his work curated by the Musée d'Art Contemporain de Montréal.

1932 births
Living people
Canadian sculptors
Canadian painters
Officers of the Order of Canada
Artists from Montreal
Members of the Royal Canadian Academy of Arts
Governor General's Award in Visual and Media Arts winners
Canadian abstract artists